Ivan Vyshenskyi (born ca. 1550 in Sudova Vyshnia – after 1620, Mount Athos, Greece) was a Ukrainian Orthodox monk and religious philosopher. He is considered to be an important polemicist of the time.

Biography
Not much is known about the life of Vyshenskyi. It is considered to be likely that he spent part of his youth in Lutsk and was connected with scholars from the Ostroh Academy. Within the years 1576–1580 he traveled to Mount Athos in Greece, which was the center of Orthodox monk culture. He stayed there until his death, with the exception of a short visit to Ukraine between 1604 and 1606 when he quarreled with members of the Lviv brotherhood.

Work
In his writings, Vyshenskyi opposed Catholicism and the uniate church. He sent messages arguing his position from Mount Athos. Vyshenskyi was especially polemic in his communications with Piotr Skarga, who supported church union. His arguments were based on opposition to the church hierarchy of Catholicism and to Byzantine asceticism. Vyshenskyi wrote not in the common Church Slavonic language, but in the Ruthenian language, an older form of Ukrainian.

Further reading
Gröschel, Bernhard (1972). Die Sprache Ivan Vyšenśkyjs: Untersuchungen und Materialien zur historischen Grammatik des Ukrainischen. Slavistische Forschungen, Band 13 (in German). Köln and Wien: Böhlau Verlag. p. 384.

External links
Ivan Vyshensky in the Encyclopedia of Ukraine

1550s births
17th-century deaths
People from Sudova Vyshnia
Ukrainian writers
Ukrainian philosophers
Eastern Orthodox monks from Ukraine
Eastern Orthodox philosophers
Athonite Fathers